Celaenorrhinus aegiochus is a species of butterfly in the family Hesperiidae. It is found from Costa Rica to Panama and Colombia.

References

aegiochus
Hesperiidae of South America
Lepidoptera of Colombia
Butterflies described in 1876
Taxa named by William Chapman Hewitson